Babyloniaca may refer to:

a lost historical work of Berossus
an ancient Greek novel of Iamblichus (novelist)